Absolute 100 is a 2001 Serbian film written and directed by Srdan Golubović. It stars Vuk Kostić, Srđan Todorović and Bogdan Diklić.

Plot summary 
The main character Saša Gordić (Vuk Kostić) is a talented shooter who followed the footsteps of his older brother Igor Gordić (Srđan Todorović), a 1991 Junior European shooting gold medallist. However, Igor had to go to war in former Yugoslavia, from which he returned from as a drug addict. In order to repay his debts of the local dealers, Igor is forced to sell their property, which their parents left them. So Saša decides to get revenge on everyone who destroyed his brothers life.

Cast

Release dates

Awards and nominations

References

External links 
 

2001 films
Serbian action films
2000s Serbian-language films
Serbian thriller films
Serbian drama films
Films set in Serbia
Films set in Belgrade
Films about the Serbian Mafia
Films shot in Belgrade